Régis Loisel (born 4 December 1951) is a French cartoonist, best known for the series La Quête de l'oiseau du temps, written by Serge Le Tendre.

He worked with Walt Disney Studios on the animated films Atlantis and Mulan.

Bibliography
 La Quête de l'oiseau du temps, 4 parts, 1983-1987
 La Dernière goutte..., 1993
 Les Farfelingues, 3 parts, 2001-2004
 Magasin Général, 9 parts, 2006-2014
 Les Nocturnes
 Norbert le lézard, 2004
 L'Offrande
 Peter Pan, 6 parts, 1990-2004
 Pyrénée, 1998
 La Quête de l'oiseau du temps (The Quest for the Time-bird), 7 parts, 1998-2022
 Troubles fêtes, 1989
 Mali Mélo, carnet d'un voyage au Mali, 2000
 "Mickey Mouse: Café Zombo", 2016
 Le grand mort, 6 parts, 2007-2019
 Un putain de salopard, 3 parts, 2019-

Awards
 1986: Lucien Award at the Angoulême International Comics Festival, France
 1992: Audience Award at the Angoulême International Comics Festival
 1995: Audience Award at the Angoulême International Comics Festival
 2000: nominated for Best German-language Comic for Children and Young People at the Max & Moritz Prizes, Germany
 2002: nominated for Best German-language Comic for Children and Young People at the Max & Moritz Prizes, Germany
 2003: nominated for the Audience Award at the Angoulême International Comics Festival
 2006: Grand Prix de la ville d'Angoulême at the Angoulême International Comics Festival
 2007: nominated for the Grand Prix, for best French language comic and for best artwork at the Prix Saint-Michel, Brussels

Notes

Resources
 Régis Loisel official site
 Régis Loisel biography on Lambiek Comiclopedia
 

French comics artists
1951 births
Living people
Grand Prix de la ville d'Angoulême winners